The 1998 World Judo Juniors Championships was an edition of the World Judo Juniors Championships, organised by the International Judo Federation. It was held in Cali, Colombia from 8 to 11 October 1998.

Medal summary

Men's events

Women's events

Source Results

Medal table

References

External links
 

World Judo Junior Championships
World Championships, U21
Judo
Judo competitions in Colombia
Judo
World Judo Juniors Championships